Universal Mobile Systems is an Uzbek-Russian telecommunications company, which provides mobile network to Republic of Uzbekistan. Universal Mobile Systems was early MTS (Mobile TeleSystems GEET, rus. Мобильные ТелеСистемы), until summer of 2012, when law enforcement authorities of Uzbekistan suspected top management operator of embezzlement and tax evasion. According to the settlement agreement, MTS has a stake in 50.01% of the share capital of UMS, the remaining share is transferred to the Republican State Unitary Enterprise "Center for radio broadcasting and television", which is administered by the State Committee of communication of Uzbekistan. The joint venture will work on infrastructure Uzdunorbita - former subsidiary of MTS in the country. In 2019, UMS was rebranded as Mobiuz.

See also
  MTS (network provider)
 Internet in Uzbekistan

References

Uzbekistan communications-related lists
Companies based in Tashkent
Telecommunications companies of Uzbekistan